The year 1649 in music involved some significant events.

Popular music
Gerrard Winstanley – "Diggers' Song"

Classical music
Melchior Franck –  for three voices (Coburg: Johann Eyrich), a funeral motet, published posthumously
Johann Jakob Froberger – Libro secondo di toccate, fantasie, canzone, allemande, courante, sarabande, gigue et altre partite (presentation manuscript, September)
Alberich Mazak – Cultus harmonicus, volume one, a collection of his complete works, published in Vienna

Opera
Pietro Cavalli – Jason
Antonio Cesti – Orontea, premiered at the Teatro Santissimi Apostoli, in Venice, during Carnivale.

Births
February 23 – John Blow, organist and composer
May 3 (bapt.) – Johann Valentin Meder, organist and composer (d. 1719)
date unknown – Johann Krieger, composer
John Blow, organist and composer
probable – Jacques Boyvin, French organist and composer (died 1706)

Deaths
April 29/30 – Giovanni Valentini, keyboard virtuoso and composer.

References

 
17th century in music
Music by year